Yankeetown is an unincorporated community located in Rockingham County, in the U.S. state of Virginia.

Geography
It is located just northwest of Fulks Run in George Washington National Forest, along Virginia State Route 259.

References

Unincorporated communities in Rockingham County, Virginia
Unincorporated communities in Virginia